The Western Romanian Carpathians, along with the Eastern Romanian Carpathians and the Southern Carpathians is one of the three main mountain ranges of Romania. Their name is given based on their geographical position, west, to the Transylvanian Plateau, which is simultaneously their eastern limits, respectively to the Timiș-Cerna Gap of the Banat Mountains, the southern group of the Western Carpathians.

The Western Carpathians are positioned between the rivers Danube, Barcău and Someș. They have a maximum elevation of 1849 m in the Bihor Mountains, Cucurbăta Mare Peak (Hungarian: Nagy-Bihar) - 1849 metres, also called Bihor Peak. Discontinuity is one of their basic characteristics. Geographical composition is varied, with a real "petrographic mosaic". (flysch, crystalline schists, limestones, igneous rocks, metamorphic rocks)

Mountain ranges
From north to south, three major mountain groups can be identified, separated by different river valleys.
 Apuseni Mountains, north of Mureș
 Poiana Ruscă Mountains, south of Mureș 
 Banat Mountains, the southwest corner of Romania, south of Timiș

There are 18 subgroups in total.

See also
 Romanian Carpathians

References

External links

 
Mountain ranges of Romania
Mountain ranges of the Carpathians
Geography of Southeastern Europe
Geography of Transylvania